Onesie or onesies may mean

 Onesie (jumpsuit), adult jumpsuit for relaxing or sleeping
Onesie (infant bodysuit), a garment worn by babies
 Knucklebones, a children's game, is also called onesies

See also
 Onesie Wednesday, a day to show support for anyone on the autistic spectrum
 Onesi Constituency, Namibia
 oneSIS, open-source software tool
 One Size Fits All (disambiguation)
 One-piece (disambiguation)